Easah Zaheer Suliman (born 26 January 1998) is an English professional footballer who plays as a centre-back for Vilafranquense on loan from Primeira Liga club Vitória de Guimarães. Suliman is a product of the Aston Villa Academy.

Suliman has represented England at youth level and is the first player of Asian heritage to captain an England football side, having done so at Under-16, Under-17 and Under-19 levels. Suliman played every game at centre back in the England Under-19s victorious UEFA European Under-19 Championship campaign in July 2017, scoring the opening goal in England's 2–1 final victory over Portugal. Suliman has played on loan at English Football League sides Cheltenham Town and Grimsby Town as well as Eredivisie side FC Emmen.

Club career

Aston Villa
Having joined the Aston Villa academy at a young age, Suliman was called up to train with the first-team squad by Rémi Garde during the 2015–16 season, and was named as a substitute for a match in the League Cup against Notts County on 25 August 2015. Suliman made his first team debut under manager Steve Bruce, featuring as a late substitute in a 4–1 League Cup victory over Wigan Athletic on 22 August 2017.

Cheltenham Town loan
On 4 August 2016, Suliman joined Cheltenham Town on loan until 2 January 2017. He made his Cheltenham debut on 6 August 2016 in a 1–1 home draw against Leyton Orient. Three days later he played the full 90 minutes in a 1–0 League Cup win against League One side Charlton Athletic.

Grimsby Town loan
On 31 January 2018, Suliman joined League Two side Grimsby Town until the end of the 2017–18 season. He made his league debut in a 1–1 draw with Port Vale on 10 March 2018.

FC Emmen loan
On 17 August 2018, Suliman joined Dutch Eredivisie side FC Emmen on a season-long loan deal.
On 28 December 2018, Suliman was recalled from his loan spell at Emmen due to him playing only 9 minutes in his 4-month spell there. The Villa staff and Emmen manager came to an agreement that the loan was 'no longer useful'.

Vitoria Guimaraes
On 21 January 2020, Suliman joined Portuguese side Vitoria Guimaraes for an undisclosed fee. On 5 June 2020, Suliman made his debut in a 2–2 draw with Sporting CP. In doing so, he became the first player of Pakistani descent to play in the top flight in Portugal. He made his first Primeira Liga start on 30 June 2020, helping his side earn a clean sheet in a 2–0 victory over Vitória.

Nacional loan
On 28 July 2021, Suliman joined recently relegated Nacional on a season-long loan. On 15 August 2021, he made his debut for Nacional as a late substitute in a 4–0 victory over Vilafranquense. Suliman made his first start on 28 August 2021 in a 2–1 home victory against Varzim in which he played the full ninety minutes.

Vilafranquense loan 
On 1 September 2022, Suliman joined Vilafranquense in the Portuguese second tier on a season-long loan. Suliman made his debut for the club on 8 October 2022, in a 0–1 home defeat to Penafiel.

International career
Suliman has represented England at U16, U17, U18, U19 and U20 levels and was the first British Asian to captain an England side at any level. Suliman captained England Under-16s at the 2014 Montaigu Tournament with the side finishing third overall. Suliman has also captained England at under-17 level against the Faroe Islands.

Suliman was promoted to the England Under-19 side in August 2016 and played the full match in a 1–1 friendly against the Netherlands Under-19 side. A penalty shoot-out was held following the match with Suliman scoring the winning penalty. Tom Davies of Everton started the game as captain but passed the armband to Suliman after he was substituted in the 61st minute.

Suliman started every game at centre back in England Under-19's victorious 2017 UEFA European Under-19 Championship campaign in July 2017. He scored the opening goal in the final, a header following a rebound off the opposition goalkeeper, in England's 2–1 win over Portugal in Georgia's Tengiz Burjanadze Stadium.

Easah is eligible to play for Pakistan because of his Pakistani background.

Personal life
Suliman has discussed his British Pakistani heritage and being a Muslim professional footballer in interviews. He has spoken of his family's friendship with England cricketer Moeen Ali and how he encouraged him to keep going to secure a professional contract.

Career statistics

Honours
England U19
UEFA European Under-19 Championship: 2017

References

External links

England profile at The FA

1998 births
Living people
British sportspeople of Pakistani descent
English people of Pakistani descent
British Asian footballers
Footballers from Birmingham, West Midlands
British Muslims
English footballers
Association football defenders
English Football League players
Eredivisie players
Primeira Liga players
Aston Villa F.C. players
Cheltenham Town F.C. players
Grimsby Town F.C. players
Vitória S.C. players
C.D. Nacional players
FC Emmen players
English expatriate footballers
Expatriate footballers in the Netherlands
Expatriate footballers in Portugal
U.D. Vilafranquense players
English expatriate sportspeople in Portugal
Liga Portugal 2 players